Principe da Beira (Forte Principe de Rivera) is a fortification on the lower part of the Guaporé River close to its confluence with the Mamoré River in the Brazilian state of Rondônia.

The fort was built from 1776 to 1783 and is one of only two forts that the Portuguese Empire built in the inner regions of Brazil. It was named after the heir of Portugal, styled as the Prince of Beira. The Portuguese built it to secure their border against the expanding Spanish Empire, which controlled the areas to the southwest of Rondônia. The military use of the fort was abandoned in 1889.

The fort has an outer wall with a height of 10 m and a length of 1 km. It has four bastions, which originally carried 14 cannons each. Only one of those cannons still remains today. Inside the wall there are ruins of a chapel, soldier quarters, a prison and various utility buildings.

References

 Regis St. Louis, Andrew Draffen: Brazil. Lonely Planet 2005, p. 666

External links

 Fotos do Real Forte Principe da Beira - photos of the fort and museum

Buildings and structures in Rondônia
Principe da beira